Palatalization  is a historical-linguistic sound change that results in a palatalized articulation of a consonant or, in certain cases, a front vowel. Palatalization involves change in the place or manner of articulation of consonants, or the fronting or raising of vowels. In some cases, palatalization involves assimilation or lenition.

Types
Palatalization is sometimes an example of assimilation. In some cases, it is triggered by a palatal or palatalized consonant or front vowel, but in other cases, it is not conditioned in any way.

Consonant
Palatalization changes place of articulation or manner of articulation of consonants. It may add palatal secondary articulation or change primary articulation from velar to palatal or alveolar, alveolar to postalveolar.

It may also cause a consonant to change its manner of articulation from stop to affricate or fricative. The change in the manner of articulation is a form of lenition. However, the lenition is frequently accompanied by a change in place of articulation.

Palatalization of velar consonants commonly causes them to front, and apical and coronal consonants are usually raised. In the process, stop consonants are often spirantised except for palatalized labials.

Palatalization, as a sound change, is usually triggered only by mid and close (high) front vowels and the semivowel . The sound that results from palatalization may vary from language to language. For example, palatalization of  may produce , etc.

In some variants of Ojibwe, velars are palatalized before , but apicals are not.

Vowel
Palatalization sometimes refers to vowel shifts, the fronting of a back vowel or raising of a front vowel. The shifts are sometimes triggered by a nearby palatal or palatalized consonant or by a high front vowel. The Germanic umlaut is a famous example.

A similar change is reconstructed in the history of Old French in which Bartsch's law turned open vowels into  or  after a palatalized velar consonant. If it was true for all open vowels in Old French, it would explain the palatalization of velar plosives before .

In Erzya, a Uralic language, the open vowel  is raised to near-open  after a palatalized consonant, as in the name of the language, .

In Russian, the back vowels  are fronted to central , and the open vowel  is raised to near-open , near palatalized consonants. The palatalized consonants also factor in how unstressed vowels are reduced.

Unconditioned
Palatalization is sometimes unconditioned or spontaneous, not triggered by a palatal or palatalized consonant or front vowel.

This first palatalization was unconditioned. It resulted in a cluster with a palatal lateral , a palatal lateral on its own, or a cluster with a palatal approximant .
 Vulgar Latin  "to call" > Aromanian  /kʎimari/, Aragonese  /kʎamar/, Spanish   (>), Italian  
 > Istriot  , Portuguese  

In the Western Romance languages, Latin  was palatalized once or twice.
 Vulgar Latin  "night" > French  , European Portuguese  , eastern Occitan , Catalan  (Old Catalan ), Mozarabic  , Galician  
 > Spanish , western Occitan , Romansh , Brazilian Portuguese

Effects

Allophony and phonemic split
Palatalization may result in a phonemic split, a historical change by which a phoneme becomes two new phonemes over time through palatalization.

Old historical splits have frequently drifted since the time they occurred and may be independent of current phonetic palatalization. The lenition tendency of palatalized consonants (by assibilation and deaffrication) is important. According to some analyses, the lenition of the palatalized consonant is still a part of the palatalization process itself.

A similar change has also happened in Polish and Belarusian. That would also be true about most dialects of Brazilian Portuguese but for the strong phonotactical resistance of its native speakers that turn dental plosives into post-alveolar affricates even in loanwords: McDonald's .

For example, Votic has undergone such a change historically, *keeli →  'language', but there is currently an additional distinction between palatalized laminal and non-palatalized apical consonants. (See History of the Spanish language and Phonological history of Spanish coronal fricatives for more information).

Examples
Palatalization has played a major role in the history of English, and of other languages and language groups throughout the world, such as the Romance, Greek, Slavic, Baltic, Finnic, Swedish, Norwegian, Mordvinic, Samoyedic, Iranian, Indo-Aryan, Goidelic, Korean, Japanese, Chinese, Albanian, Arabic, and Micronesian languages.

English

Anglo-Frisian

Palatalization only occurred in certain environments, and so it did not apply to all words from the same root. This is the origin of some alternations in cognate words, such as speak and speech , cold and chill , burrow and bury , dawn and day .

Some English words with palatalization have unpalatalized doublets from the Northumbrian dialect and from Old Norse, such as shirt and skirt , church and kirk , ditch and dike .

Other 

Others include the following:
Palatisation of /s/ to /ʃ/ in modern English
In some English-speaking areas, the sound /s/ changed to /ʃ/, like for example in the words Worcestershire (/wʊs.tɚ.ʃiɹ/ to /wʊʃ.tɚ.ʃiɹ/) and Association (/əˌsoʊsiˈeɪʃən/ to /əˌsoʊʃiˈeɪʃən/). 
Various other examples include Asphault, (to) assume.
Rhotic palatalization:
This is found in non-rhotic dialects of New York City, according to Labov, triggered by the loss of the coil–curl merger.  It results in the palatalization of /ɝ/.  (Labov never specified the resultant vowel.)

Semitic languages

Arabic

Historical 
While in most Semitic languages, e.g.

Modern Arabic dialects 
These three palatalizations occur in a variety of dialects, including Iraqi, rural Levantine varieties (e.g. rural Palestinian), a number of Gulf Arabic dialects, such as Kuwaiti, Qatari, Bahraini, and Emarati, as well as others like Najdi, the southern dialects of Saudi Arabia, parts of Oman and Yemen and various Bedouin dialects across the Arab World. Examples:

  ('dog')  > Iraqi and Gulf  , and traditional Najdi .
  ('rooster')  > rural Palestinian 
 ('Sharjah')  > Gulf  while other neighboring dialects pronounce it  without palatalization.
 ('new')  > Gulf 
  ('water container')  > traditional Najdi , although this phenomenon is fading among the younger generations where  is pronounced  like in most other dialects in Saudi Arabia.

Palatalization occurs in the pronunciation of the second person feminine singular pronoun in those dialects. For instance:

Classical Arabic  'your eye' (to a female)  is pronounced:

  in Gulf, Iraqi, and rural levantine dialects (e.g. rural Palestinian)
  in traditional Najdi and a number of bedouin dialects.

Speakers in these dialects that do not use the palatalization would merge the feminine and masculine suffix pronouns e.g.

Assyrian Neo-Aramaic
Assyrian Neo-Aramaic features the palatalization of kaph (turning  into ), taw (turning  into ) and gimel (turning  into ), albeit in some dialects only and seldom in the standardized version of the language.
 may be palatalized to  among Assyrians who originate from Urmia; Iran; and Nochiya, southeastern Turkey.

Romance languages

The Romance languages developed from Vulgar Latin, the colloquial form of Latin spoken in the Roman Empire. Various palatalizations occurred during the historical development of the Romance languages. Some groups of the Romance languages underwent more palatalizations than others. One palatalization affected all groups, some palatalizations affected most groups, and one affected only a few groups.

Gallo-Romance
In Gallo-Romance, Vulgar Latin * became * very early, with the subsequent deaffrication and some further developments of the vowel. For instance:
  "cat" >  
  "bald" (fem.) >  
 * "white" (fem.) >  
 "chain" >  
 "dear" >  

Early English borrowings from French show the original affricate, as chamber  "(private) room" < Old French   < Vulgar Latin ; compare French   "room".

Mouillé
Mouillé ("moistened") is a term for palatal consonants in the Romance languages.

L and n mouillé have a variety of origins in the Romance languages.

Satem languages

In certain Indo-European language groups, the reconstructed "palato-velars" of Proto-Indo-European  were palatalized into sibilants. The language groups with and without palatalization are called satem and centum languages, after the characteristic developments of the PIE word for "hundred":
PIE  > Avestan satəm (palatalization)
Latin   (no palatalization)

Slavic languages

The Slavic languages are known for their tendency towards palatalization.

In Proto-Slavic or Common Slavic times the velars *k *g *x experienced three successive palatalizations. In the first palatalization they were fronted to *č *ž *š before the front vowels *e *ē *i *ī. In the second palatalization, the velars changed to *c, *dz or *z, and *s or *š (depending on dialect) before new *ē *ī (either from monophthongization of previous diphthongs or from borrowings). The third palatalization, also called the progressive palatalization, was triggered by a preceding *i or *ī and had the same outcomes as the third palatalization.

In the process of iotation various sounds were also palatalized in front of the semivowel *j. The results vary by language.

In addition, there were further palatalizing sound changes in the various Slavic languages after the break-up of Proto-Slavic. In some of them, including Polish and Russian, most sounds were palatalized by a following front vowel, causing the rise of a phonological opposition between hard (unpalatalized) and soft (palatalized) consonants. In Kashubian and the neighboring Polish dialects the reflexes of PS velars *k *g were palatalized a fourth time before front vowels, resulting in palatal affricates.

Sinitic languages

In many varieties of Chinese, namely Mandarin, Northern Wu, and several others scattered throughout China, the velar series, were palatalized before the medials  and shifted to alveolo-palatal series . Postal romanization does not show palatalized consonants, reflecting the dialect of the imperial court during the Qing dynasty.

See also 
 Iotation, a related process in Slavic languages
 Labio-palatalization
 Index of phonetics articles
 Manner of articulation
 Palatalization in Standard Chinese
 Palatalization in Tatar
 Palatalization in Vulgar Latin
 Soft sign, a Cyrillic grapheme indicating palatalization

References

Bibliography
 Bynon, Theodora. Historical Linguistics. Cambridge University Press, 1977.
 

Crowley, Terry. (1997) An Introduction to Historical Linguistics. 3rd edition. Oxford University Press.

External links
 Erkki Savolainen, Internetix 1998. Suomen murteet – Koprinan murretta. (with a sound sample with palatalized t')
 Frisian assibilation as a hypercorrect effect due to a substrate language

Assimilation (linguistics)
Vowel shifts
Historical linguistics
Palatal consonants